The Holy Resurrection Church is a Cultural Monument of Albania, in Mborje, Korçë County. The church is dedicated to Saint Mary.

History
One of the oldest churches in the Balkans, it has several possible construction dates. One tradition holds that it was built in 896 in honor of Pope Clement I, while another attests to construction in the 14th century. The church lies at the foot of Mount Morava just southeast of Korçë, and features anonymous frescoes dating to 1390. On the 40th Day after death each year, pilgrims of the Albanian Orthodox Church flock to the church.

Description

At the time it was built, the church was under the rule of the Lordship of Berat, dominated by the Muzaka family of feudal lords. A bishop named Nimfoni collected funds for construction from 1389 to 1390. A striking if small edifice, it belongs to a group of churches with an engraved cross lacking internal reinforcement. A central square cella topped with a dome forms the center, connected by two open gates (one to the south and one to the west) with the portico. The church is only  at its highest.

Maintenance work was needed to avoid collapse in 2015.

References

External links
Images of the Church
Institute of Cultural Monuments (IMK) page
Ministry of Tourism, Culture, Youth, and Sports page

Mborje
Mborje
Mborje
Churches in Albania